Eunoe subtruncata is a scale worm described from the Sea of Japan.

Description
Number of segments 42–45; elytra 15 pairs. Prostomium anterior margin comprising two rounded lobes. Lateral antennae inserted ventrally (beneath prostomium and median antenna). Elytra marginal fringe of papillae present. Notochaetae distinctly thicker than neurochaetae. Bidentate neurochaetae absent.

References

Phyllodocida
Fauna of the Pacific Ocean
Animals described in 1937